C. L. Appelgate and Company was a bourbon whiskey distillery  established and located in Yelvington, Kentucky. It was owned, built and operated by Colonel C.L. Applegate and his brother Edward Applegate sometime between 1875 and 1880 on the west of the road between Maceo and Yelvington, Kentucky, today known as KY Hwy 405, on land purchased from Sam Taylor Hawes of Yelvington. The company made only bourbon whiskey using the brand names Rosebud and Beechwood.

The plant had a mashing capacity of nearly 250 bushels a day.  The distillery discontinued product in the fall of 1890 due to a water shortage but had whiskey in its warehouses until 1908 or 1909.

In 1906 Col. Applegate along with his brother, Edward, arranged new financing for the distillery with Mr. Henry Vogt of the Vogt Machine Company in Louisville, Kentucky and began operating again. They continued production until the early spring of 1907, at which time they closed down.

By the fall of 1908 and 1909 bourbon whiskey still remained in the warehouses. Portions of the plant remained well into the mid-1900s.  All that remains today are the distillery ponds.

Internal Revenue Service recorded warehouse transactions for The C. L. Applegate Distillery as follows:
1898: C L Applegate & Co.: Code T. (Spirits were withdrawn upon payment of tax) and Code W
(Spirits remained in the warehouse at the close of the year).

Information from insurance underwriter records compiled in 1892 suggest that the distillery property included a two frame warehouses, both with metal or slate roofs. Warehouse "A" was 115 ft north of the still house, warehouse "B" was 107 ft south. The distillery itself was constructed similarly. The property also included cattle and a barn. The owner is recorded as being C. L. Applegate & Co.

References

See also 

 List of cocktails with bourbon
 List of whisky brands
 Corn whiskey
 Rye whiskey
 Moonshine
 Tennessee whiskey
 American whiskey
 American Whiskey Trail
 Bourbon Trail
 Bottled in bond

Daviess County, Kentucky
Bourbon whiskey
Defunct manufacturing companies based in Kentucky
Distilleries in Kentucky